Lieutenant General James Francis Pardoe Swift,  (born 6 October 1967) is a senior British Army officer.

Early life and education
Swift was born on 6 October 1967 in Bottisham, Cambridgeshire, England. He was educated at Netherhall School and Hills Road Sixth Form College. He studied chemistry at Christ Church, Oxford, graduating with a Bachelor of Arts (BA) degree in 1989; as per tradition, his BA was promoted to a Master of Arts (MA Oxon) degree in 1992.

Military career
Swift was commissioned in to the Royal Regiment of Wales on 1 September 1989. He served as commanding officer of the 2nd Battalion, the Royal Welsh during the Iraq War, for which he was appointed an Officer of the Order of the British Empire (OBE) on 25 July 2008. He became Commander of the 20th Armoured Brigade in May 2012.

Swift was appointed Director of Strategy in March 2016; the post was re-titled as Assistant Chief of the General Staff in September 2018. He became General Officer Commanding the 3rd (United Kingdom) Division in November 2018. It was announced on 30 January 2020 that Swift would become Chief of Defence People (CDP), succeeding Lieutenant General Richard Nugee in late February 2020. Swift was promoted to lieutenant general on 27 February 2020.

Swift was appointed Companion of the Order of the Bath (CB) in the 2023 New Year Honours.

References

|-

|-

British Army generals
Companions of the Order of the Bath
Officers of the Order of the British Empire
1967 births
Royal Regiment of Wales officers
Alumni of Christ Church, Oxford
The Royal Welsh officers
Living people
Military personnel from Cambridgeshire